Modern Fix was a monthly music and culture magazine that was published bi-monthly by Michael Bushman (singer/guitarist of FanOffBirdSafe, Spicoli, and Primitive Son) and Eric Huntington. The magazine was in circulation between 2000 and 2008.  Its main focus was music-based, in addition to videogame coverage, comedian interviews (David Cross, Lewis Black, etc.) and comics (Too Much Coffee Man).

The bands Thursday (band), Thrice and The Unicorns received their first cover feature in Modern Fix.

References

External links
 ModernFix.com

Defunct magazines published in the United States
Magazines established in 2000
Magazines disestablished in 2007
Magazines published in California
Mass media in San Diego
Music magazines published in the United States
Monthly magazines published in the United States